Tiruthandalaineeneri Neenerinathar Temple
is a Hindu temple located at Thandalacherry in Tiruvarur district, Tamil Nadu, India. The temple is dedicated to Shiva, as the moolavar presiding deity, in his manifestation as Neenrinathar. His consort, Parvati, is known as Gnanambikai. The historical name of the place is Tiru Thandalai Neel Neeri.

Significance 
It is one of the shrines of the 275 Paadal Petra Sthalams - Shiva Sthalams glorified in the early medieval Tevaram poems by Tamil Saivite Nayanar Tirugnanasambandar.

References

External links 
 
 

Shiva temples in Tiruvarur district
Padal Petra Stalam